Ensko is a surname. Notable people with the surname include:

Robert F. Ensko (1855–1934), American silver expert and author
Stephen Guernsey Cook Ensko (1896–1969), American silver expert, son of Robert